Sandy railway station serves the town of Sandy in Bedfordshire, England. Sandy is managed by Great Northern but all train services are operated by  Thameslink.

Sandy station was originally built in 1850 for the Great Northern Railway; the London and North Western Railway opened an adjacent station in 1862. The stations were later merged into one, which has since undergone many changes.

The present station has two large platforms and 4 main rail lines, a pair of "up and down" slow lines used by stopping services and a pair of "up and down" fast lines used by high speed services passing through. A fifth line extends off the "up" slow line which links into the remaining sidings and original bay platforms. There is also a sixth line off the "down" slow line that links to a siding beside Platform1.

History

Sandy was one of the original stations, opening with the line on 7 August 1850.

The Sandy and Potton Railway was opened for goods traffic on 23 June 1857, and to passengers on 9 November 1857. It was later purchased by the Bedford and Cambridge Railway (B&CR), which closed the line in January 1862 for reconstruction. The line reopened on 7 July 1862, including a new station at Sandy separate from, but adjacent to, the GNR station. The B&CR was absorbed by the London and North Western Railway (LNWR) in 1865. The eastern section of the Bedford-Cambridge route (sometimes known as the Varsity Line) closed on 1 January 1968, and with it, the ex-LNWR platforms at Sandy.

The two stations were physically adjacent, and shared an island platform. In 1917 the LNWR station was placed under the management of the GNR, and then shared the booking facilities. After the closure of the Varsity Line, the station was considerably rebuilt in the early 1970s to give a 4-track layout throughout, and platforms on the slow lines only, thus removing a 2-track bottleneck on the East Coast Main Line.

Sandy railway station was the site of the English unjust enrichment case Great Northern Railway Co. v Swaffield (1874) LR 9 Exch 132, in which the defendant sent a horse to this railway station, to be collected.  His employee arrived the next day, but the station master demanded that he pay livery stable costs for the night; the employee refused to pay, and did not collect the horse.  The defendant arrived later, and demanded payment to compensate him for duress of goods (after the station master offered to pay livery stable costs out of pocket); after the station master refused to pay such compensation, the defendant left the horse in the possession of the station for four months during litigation.  The Court of the Exchequer held the defendant liable for four months' stable costs, as the plaintiff in the case 'had not choice, unless they would leave the horse at the station or in the high road to his own danger and the danger of other people' (per Kelly CB).  In this way the court recognised a limited exception to the rule that no claim for salvage be recognised by the courts outside the context of salvage in tidal waters.  The stable costs were paid to the use of the defendant by way of necessity, and therefore constituted unjust enrichment.

Facilities

Sandy station has a small café inside the booking office on Platform 2. There is a large sheltered area with seating on Platform 1, and a smaller one on Platform 2. Both platforms have step-free access via the external road bridge. However the slope to the bridge is relatively steep on both sides of the railway and the footpath on the bridge is quite narrow.

In the later half of 2016, modern ticket barriers were installed at the entrance to both platforms along with a covered area to protect them from wind and rain damage. When in use, there are staff on hand if any issues arise.

The station has two modern touch screen ticket machines located in front of the booking office, and there are cycle storage facilities to the south of it. The station also has help points throughout, which were installed by former franchise holder First Capital Connect.

Services
All services at Sandy are operated by Thameslink using  EMUs.

The typical off-peak service in trains per hour is:
 2 tph to  via ,  and 

On Sundays, the service is reduced to hourly and southbound services run to  instead of Horsham.

Future
In 2017, there was speculation that the station might be relocated from its current position in the town centre to a new site just to the north of the  town. Concern has been expressed locally that a new EWR/ECML interchange hub at Tempsford railway station may lead to the closure of Sandy station.

Location

References

External links

 http://www.bedfordshire.gov.uk/CommunityAndLiving/ArchivesAndRecordOffice/CommunityArchives/Sandy/TheDeathOfASandyStationMaster.aspx (with photographs of both old stations)

Railway stations in Bedfordshire
DfT Category E stations
Former Great Northern Railway stations
Railway stations in Great Britain opened in 1850
Railway stations served by Govia Thameslink Railway
Sandy, Bedfordshire

Former London and North Western Railway stations
Railway stations in Great Britain opened in 1862
Railway stations in Great Britain closed in 1968
1862 establishments in England